Sisyracera inabsconsalis is a moth in the family Crambidae. It was described by Heinrich Benno Möschler in 1890. It is found on Puerto Rico and Cuba.

References

Moths described in 1890
Pyraustinae
Moths of the Caribbean
Taxa named by Heinrich Benno Möschler